The 2013 Soho Square Ladies Tournament was a professional tennis tournament played on outdoor clay courts. It was the first edition of the tournament which was part of the 2013 ITF Women's Circuit, offering a total of $75,000+H in prize money. It took place in Sharm el-Sheikh, Egypt, on 18–24 November 2013.

Singles entrants

Seeds 

 1 Rankings as of 11 November 2013

Other entrants 
The following players received wildcards into the singles main draw:
  Fatma Al-Nabhani
  Yuliya Kalabina
  Pauline Payet
  Marina Shamayko

The following players received entry from the qualifying draw:
  Nastja Kolar
  Karin Morgošová
  Raluca Olaru
  Daniela Seguel

The following player received entry into the singles main draw as a lucky loser:
  Maša Zec Peškirič

The following player received entry by a protected ranking:
  Evgeniya Rodina

The following player received entry by a junior exempt:
  Kateřina Siniaková

Champions

Singles 

  Victoria Kan def.  Nastja Kolar 6–4, 6–4

Doubles 

  Timea Bacsinszky /  Kristina Barrois def.  Anna Morgina /  Kateřina Siniaková 6–7(5–7), 6–0, [10–4]

External links 
 2013 Soho Square Ladies Tournament at ITFtennis.com

2013 ITF Women's Circuit